The Thunder Bay K&A Wolverines were a Canadian junior ice hockey team based in Thunder Bay, Ontario.  They were members of the Superior International Junior Hockey League.  They played in the Thunder Bay Junior B Hockey League of Hockey Northwestern Ontario  until 2009.  The Wolverines were 4-time Thunder Bay Junior B and Northern Ontario Junior B champions, as well as 2009 Keystone Cup Western Canada silver medalists.

History

2005–06 
The Wolverines won their first Thunder Bay Junior B Hockey League title in 2005–06 in only their third year of existence.  They finished first in the regular season with 22 wins, 5 losses, and 3 ties.  In the first round, the Wolverines beat the Nipigon Elks with 3 wins, 0 losses, and a tie.  The final series saw them in a thriller with the Thunder Bay Northern Hawks, with the Wolverines squeezing out the win with 3 wins, 2 losses, and 2 ties.  The final game resulted in a tie, but the Northern Hawks were extremely close to forcing an 8th and deciding game.  The Wolverines were out classed at the 2006 Keystone Cup with 0 wins and 5 losses, failing to make the semi-final round.  They started off the tourney against the North Winnipeg Satelites of the Keystone Junior Hockey League with a 6–4 loss.  The Wolverines then were blown out by the host Campbell River Storm of the Vancouver Island Junior Hockey League by a score of 8–2.  The Saskatoon Royals of the North Saskatchewan Junior B Hockey League then beat them 5–2, followed by the Red Deer Vipers of the Heritage Junior B Hockey League shutting them down 6–0.  The Wolverines finished their season with an 8–3 blowout loss to the Delta Ice Hawks of the Pacific International Junior Hockey League.

2006–07 
The Wolverines won their second straight TBJBHL regular season crown in 2006–07 with a 24–3–3 record.  They moved directly into the league final against the highly competitive Thunder Bay Northern Hawks.  The Hawks took Game 1 6–3, they tied the next game 2–2, and the third game was won by the Hawks 4–2.  In this race to 8 points, the Hawks were leading 5–1.  The Wolverines took the fourth game 3–2, but the Northern Hawks took Game 5 7–4 to take a 7-points-to-3 series lead.  The Hawks could take the series with a win or tie.  It was not to be, the Wolverines came together came back with a comeback, winning Game 6 4–1 and Game 7 6–1.  With the series tied 7–7, Game 8 had to be a win for either team to take the playoff crown.  The Wolverines competed the comeback winning the game 5–3 and the series 9-points-to-7.

The Wolverines, as Northern Ontario Jr. B champions, received their second crack at the Keystone Cup in Fort Qu'Appelle, Saskatchewan.  They lost their first game to the Saskatoon Royals 4–1.  In their second game, they were crushed by the Fort Qu'Appelle Fort Knox 7–1.  Game 3 did not go well either, as they lost 8–2 to the Winnipeg Saints.  The final game had the Wolverines lose to the Victoria Cougars 4–2.  They exited the championship without a win.

2007–08
In 2007–08, the Wolverines may have had the best regular season in TBJBHL history, outside of the 2003–04 Thunder Bay Northern Hawks undefeated season.  After going 24–1–5, the Wolverines found themselves, again, in the finals against the Northern Hawks.  The Hawks won Game 1 5–1, but the Wolverines countered with 5–0 and 6–3 victories in the next two games.  Game 4 was a 5–4 Hawks victory to even out the series, but games 5 and 6 went to the Wolverines 6–5 and 6–3 respectively to win the Wolverines a third straight playoff title.

The Wolverines moved on the Keystone Cup in Selkirk, Manitoba.  They started off the tournament on a promising note—their first point in three years: the Wolverines tied the Pilot Butte Storm 3–3.  The next game, the Wolverines fell to the Norway House North Stars 5–1.  In the third game of the tournament, the Wolverines lost 6–1 to the Sherwood Park Knights and later that night they lost 8–1 to the Grandview Steelers.  They finished off their third Keystone Cup tournament with a 5–1 loss to the Selkirk Fishermen.

2008–09
In 2008 it was announced that the Wolverines would be the hosts of the 2009 Keystone Cup tournament.  They finished the Thunder Bay Jr. B season in first place with a 25–5–0 record.  In the league final, the Wolverines defeated the Thunder Bay Northern Hawks 4-games-straight to win the league.

Both the Wolverines and the Northern Hawks advanced to the Keystone Cup, played at the Thunder Bay Tournament Centre in April 2009.  The Wolverines started the tournament with a 6–1 win over the Northern Hawks.  Later that night, they beat the Keystone Junior Hockey League's St. Malo Warriors 5–4.  The next day, they started by defeating the Pacific International Junior Hockey League's Richmond Sockeyes 3–1, then later beat the North Eastern Alberta Junior B Hockey League's Lloydminster Bandits 7–3 to clinch a spot in the tournament's gold medal game.  The Wolverines finished the tournament round robin with a perfect 5–0 record by defeating the Prairie Junior Hockey League's Saskatoon Royals 3–0.  The final round robin game was marred by a brawl late in the third period, instigated by the Royals.  In the final, the Wolverines faced the Sockeyes again.  The Wolverines led multiple times in the game, but the Sockeyes tied the game midway through the third period to force overtime.  It took a second overtime frame, but the Wolverines eventually lost to the Sockeyes by a score of 6–5.  The Silver Medal performance at the 2009 Keystone Cup marked the best performance by a Thunder Bay Junior B team since the 1999 Fort William Hurricanes won the Keystone Cup championship.

On June 14, 2009, the Thunder Bay Wolverines were promoted to Junior A as members of the Superior International Junior Hockey League.

2009–10
The Wolverines began their first season in the Junior A Superior International Junior Hockey League on September 18, 2009.  At home, the Wolverines lost to the Fort Frances Lakers 3–2.  The next night, the Wolverines defeated the Lakers 4–3 to get their first ever Junior A victory.

Mid-season, the Wolverines moved to Schreiber, Ontario.  The entire league schedule was altered to reflect this and the league was informed of the move.  After only a couple of games, the team was moved back to Thunder Bay and their website claimed that the move to Schreiber was never meant to be permanent.

The Wolverines finished fourth in the league, but lost the league quarter-final to an underdog Fort Frances Lakers.

On June 7, 2010, the Wolverines unceremoniously and without stated reason left the SIJHL.  For owner Bill MacLaurin, this was the third time he had dropped ownership of a team in the SIJHL (first was the Featherman Hawks and second was the Schreiber Diesels).  This was after a second season was announced by the club, that the team would be moving to the Fort William First Nation Arena, and tryout dates were given.

Season-by-season standings

Playoffs
2010 Lost Quarter-final
Fort Frances Lakers defeated Thunder Bay Wolverines 4-games-to-3

Defunct Lakehead Junior Hockey League teams
Defunct Superior International Junior Hockey League teams
Sport in Thunder Bay